The Imperial Abbey of Kaisersheim (German:Reichsstift Kaisersheim or Kloster Kaisersheim), was a Cistercian monastery in Kaisersheim (now Kaisheim), Bavaria, Germany.

As one of the 40-odd self-ruling imperial abbeys of the Holy Roman Empire, Kaisersheim was a virtually independent state. Its abbot had seat and voice at the Imperial Diet where he sat on the Bench of the Prelates of Swabia. At the time of its secularisation in 1802, the Abbey covered 136 square kilometers and has 9,500-10,000 subjects.

History 
The monastery was founded by Henry II, Count of Lechsgemünd (d. 1142) and his wife Liutgard, and was a daughter house of Lucelle Abbey in Alsace. Count Henry's initial gift of the land was made in 1133; the foundation charter was dated 21 September 1135. The first church was dedicated in 1183 by the Bishop of Augsburg, but was damaged in a fire in 1286, and re-built in its entirety between 1352 and 1387, when the new building was dedicated.

The foundation charter guaranteed the new monastery immunity and independence from secular powers, but on the extinction of the Counts of Lechsgemünd in 1327, their territories passed to the Wittelsbach Counts of Graisbach, who were unwilling to honour the original terms. Although in 1346 the abbey succeeded in obtaining from the Emperor Charles IV a confirmation of the rights included in the charter, and was declared an Imperial abbey, the Wittelsbachs were not inclined to honour it.

In 1505, the territory of Pfalz-Neuburg was created, which inherited the rights of the County of Graisbach, including territorial rights over Kaisheim. During the Reformation, the conversion of Otto Henry, Duke of Neuburg and Elector Palatine, to Protestantism, led to fears the abbey would be dissolved, although this danger soon passed.

Finally, in 1656 the then abbot George IV Müller reached agreement with Duke Philip of Pfalz-Neuburg that the abbey's Imperial immediacy would be respected. This carried with it the obligation however to provide troops to the imperial army when required, and from this date onwards the abbey had to accommodate a small standing force of soldiers of some 80 men.

The buildings underwent a major re-building in the 1720s in the Baroque style.

In 1802, the abbey was dissolved in the secularisation of Bavaria, and its assets taken by the Bavarian state. The premises were at first used for military purposes, later as accommodation for the displaced Bavarian Franciscans. From 1816, the buildings have been used as a prison, and now house the Justizvollzugsanstalt Kaisheim.

The Kaiser's Hall and the library are of particular architectural interest. In the east wing, known as the Kaiser's wing, the Bayerisches Strafvollzugsmuseum has displayed the permanent exhibition Behind Bars since 1989.

Abbots of Kaisersheim 

 Udalrich 1133-1155
 Konrad I 1155-1165
 Diethelm 1165-1174
 Albert 1174-1194
 Ebbo 1194-1210
 Konrad II 1210-1228
 Heinrich I 1228-1239
 Richard 1239-1251
 Wolvich 1251-1262
 Heinrich II 1262-1266
 Trutwin 1266-1287
 Heinrich III 1287-1302
 Johann I Chonold 1302-1320
 Ulrich I Zoller 1320-1339
 Ulrich II Nubling 1339-1360
 Johann II Zauer 1360-1379
 Johann III Molitor 1379-1400
 Johann IV Scherb 1400-1422
 Kraft von Hochstadt 1422-1427
 Leonhard Weinmayer 1427-1440
 Nikolaus Kolb 1440-1458
 Georg I 1458-1479
 Johann V Vister 1479-1490
 Georg II Kastner 1490-1509
 Konrad III Reutter 1509-1540
 Johann VI Zauer 1540-1575
 Ulrich III 1575-1586
 Georg III 1586-1589
 Domenicus 1589-1594
 Sebastian 1594-1608
 Johann VII 1608-1626
 Jakob 1626-1637
 Georg IV 1637-1667
 Benedikt 1667-1674
 Hieronymus 1675-1681
 Elias 1681-1696
 Judas Thaddäus 1696-1698
 Roger von Röltz 1698-1739
 Cölestin I Meermols 1739-1771
 Cölestin II Angelsbrucker 1771-1783
 Franz Xaver Müller 1783-1803

Notes and references

External links 

  Kaisheim town website: history of Kaisheim Abbey
   Klöster in Bayern
  Bayerisches Strafvollzugsmuseum Kaisheim

Monasteries in Bavaria
Cistercian monasteries in Germany
Imperial abbeys disestablished in 1802–03
Prisons in Bavaria
1130s establishments in Germany
Religious organizations established in the 1130s
Christian monasteries established in the 12th century
Donau-Ries

fr:Abbaye de Heggbach